The American Samoa Track & Field Association (ASTFA) is the governing body for the sport of athletics in American Samoa.

History 
Athletes from American Samoa participated already at the 1969 and 1971 South Pacific Games.

ASTFA was founded in 1976, and was affiliated to the IAAF in the year 1986.

Current president is Don Fuimaono Lutu.

Affiliations 
International Association of Athletics Federations (IAAF)
Oceania Athletics Association (OAA)
Moreover, it is part of the following national organisations:
American Samoa National Olympic Committee (ASNOC)

National records 
ASTFA maintains the American Samoan records in athletics.

References

External links
Official Webpage

National members of the Oceania Athletics Association
Sports in American Samoa
Athletics in American Samoa
National governing bodies for athletics
Sports organizations established in 1976